Eddie Jamaal Griffin (May 30, 1982 – August 17, 2007) was an American professional basketball player from Philadelphia. He last played for the NBA's Minnesota Timberwolves, who waived him on March 13, 2007. Months later, he was killed in a car crash.

College career

After a standout career at Roman Catholic High School of Philadelphia in which he was named Parade's National Player of the Year, he competed in the McDonald's All-American Game and led Roman to the Philadelphia Catholic League Championship in his junior and senior years.  However, in a harbinger of things to come, Griffin was forced to finish his senior year via correspondence courses after getting in a fight with a teammate.

As a freshman, Griffin averaged 17.8 points, 10.7 rebounds, and 4.4 blocks for Seton Hall and was at one point thought to be a potential top pick in the 2001 NBA draft. He was named the nation's Freshman of the Year by Sporting News.

In January 2001, Griffin got in a fight with teammate Ty Shine. Griffin left the school in somewhat acrimonious circumstances after his freshman year, and made himself available for the NBA Draft. Shortly before the draft, Griffin's half-brother Marvin Powell died of a heart attack.

NBA career

Despite Griffin's freshman year at Seton Hall, the lingering question about his attitude saw him slip to the seventh overall pick of the 2001 NBA draft, where he was selected by the New Jersey Nets, who immediately traded the  rights to him over to the Houston Rockets in exchange for those to Jason Collins, Brandon Armstrong, and Richard Jefferson (all of whom selected likewise in the 2001 draft).

In his rookie year, Griffin played in 73 games (starting 24) while averaging 8.8 points, 5.7 rebounds, and 1.84 blocks per game (ranking 13th in the NBA in that category). He followed this in 2002-03 with per-game averages of 8.6 points, 6.0 rebounds, and 1.44 blocks.

Off the court, Griffin suffered from alcoholism, and his troubles piled up quickly over the ensuing year. In December 2003, the Rockets released him after he missed practices and engaged in a team fight. Griffin signed with the Nets in January 2004, only to miss the entire 2003–04 season, when he entered an alcohol rehabilitation center.

Prior to the 2004–05 season, the Timberwolves signed Griffin to a one-year contract, for which season he posted roughly the same numbers as he had done for his previous two. The Timberwolves re-signed Griffin for three years (player option in the third), starting with the 2005–06 season. Griffin had a significant drop-off in scoring and rebounding, albeit while suffering only a slight decrease in minutes and while averaging a career-high in blocks per game (2.11).

On March 30, 2006, Griffin was involved in a car crash. Filling in the ignominious circumstances preceding the collision, witnesses and friends stated that he was watching a "pornographic movie on a DVD in his vehicle, and was  masturbating.". After the accident, he proceeded to enter a nearby convenience store, where, as per the store's security camera footage, he lamented  his being  drunk and without driver's license to the clerk;  it also showed Griffin begging the man whose SUV he had struck not to call the police and promising to buy him a new car in exchange.

Griffin's final NBA game was played on December 13, 2006, in a 82–95 Timberwolves loss to the San Antonio Spurs. Griffin played for 48 seconds and recorded no stats except for a missed three-pointer, his only such attempt of the season. In March 2007, Griffin was released by the Timberwolves.

In 303 NBA games (117 starts), Griffin averaged 7.2 points, 5.8 rebounds, 0.8 assists, 1.7 blocks, and 22:12 of floor time per game.

Death
Griffin died as a result of a car crash on August 17, 2007, at approximately 1:30 a.m. Houston police said in a report that Griffin ignored a railroad warning and went through a barrier before striking a moving train. The resulting fire burned Griffin's SUV and the side of a railcar carrying plastic granules. Griffin's body was badly burned and there was no initial identification. Dental records later revealed the man was Griffin. He had more than three times the legal alcohol limit in his system when he crashed, according to an autopsy report. The Harris County Medical Examiner's office said the 25-year-old Griffin died of "multiple blunt force injuries." The medical examiner's office performed tests on Griffin's bile and blood from his heart and liver and determined his blood-alcohol level was 0.26; the legal limit in Texas is 0.08. Tests found no traces of cocaine, barbiturates or any other narcotics.
Former Timberwolves coach Dwane Casey said he had not talked to Griffin in five or six months, but he knew that Griffin was spending the summer trying to get back in shape to play in Europe the next season. He was buried in Northwood Cemetery in Philadelphia.  At the time of his death he had a three-year-old daughter named Amaree.

NBA career statistics

Regular season

Source

|-
| style="text-align:left;"| 
| style="text-align:left;"| Houston
| 73 || 24 || 26.0 || .366 || .330 || .744 || 5.7 || .7 || .2 || 1.8 || 8.8
|-
| style="text-align:left;"| 
| style="text-align:left;"| Houston
| 77 || 66 || 24.5 || .400 || .333 || .617 || 6.0 || 1.1 || .7 || 1.4 || 8.6
|-
| style="text-align:left;"| 
| style="text-align:left;"| Minnesota
| 70 || 0 || 21.3 || .387 || .328 || .718 || 6.5 || .8 || .3 || 1.7 || 7.5
|-
| style="text-align:left;"| 
| style="text-align:left;"| Minnesota
| 70 || 27 || 19.4 || .351 || .195 || .595 || 5.6 || .6 || .2 || 2.1 || 4.6
|-
| style="text-align:left;"| 
| style="text-align:left;"| Minnesota
| 13 || 0 || 7.1 || .259 || .000 || .800 || 1.9 || .3 || .0 || .5 || 1.4
|-
| style="text-align:center;" colspan="2"| Career
| 303 || 117 || 22.2 || .377 || .315 || .671 || 5.8 || .8 || .3 || 1.7 || 7.2

See also

List of basketball players who died during their careers

References

External links
Career statistics at Basketball-Reference.com
NBA.com Profile - Eddie Griffin

1982 births
2007 deaths
African-American basketball players
Alcohol-related deaths in Texas
American men's basketball players
Centers (basketball)
Houston Rockets players
McDonald's High School All-Americans
Minnesota Timberwolves players
New Jersey Nets draft picks
Parade High School All-Americans (boys' basketball)
Power forwards (basketball)
Road incident deaths in Texas
Seton Hall Pirates men's basketball players
Burials at Northwood Cemetery, Philadelphia
Basketball players from Philadelphia
20th-century African-American sportspeople
21st-century African-American sportspeople